The Battle of Santa Vittoria was an encounter battle or skirmish in the Italian region of Emilia-Romagna on 26 July 1702 during the War of the Spanish Succession between a French force under Louis Joseph, duc de Vendôme and an Imperial  cavalry detachment under General Annibal Visconti.

Prelude
Control of the Duchies of Milan and Mantua was the main strategic prize in Northern Italy as they were key to the security of Austria's southern border. In February 1701, both accepted French garrisons with Victor Amadeus II, Duke of Savoy also signing an alliance with France in April. In May, an Austrian army under Prince Eugene of Savoy  entered Northern Italy and won a series of victories which by February 1702 forced the French behind the Adda river.

Shortages of money, men and supplies meant Prince Eugene was unable to take full advantage of this success; he imposed a blockade on Mantua, hoping to starve it into surrender rather than taking it by assault. In early March Vendôme assumed command from Villeroi, captured at Cremona in February; with his army substantially reinforced, Vendôme embarked on a series of marches and counter marches to relieve Mantua.

Although Vendôme escorted a resupply convoy into Mantua, Eugene continued the blockade, basing himself behind fortified positions or la fossa Montanara near Borgoforte and a number of bloody skirmishes took place. In June, Vendôme was joined at Cremona by the new Bourbon King of Spain Philip V; the two split their forces, Philip besieging Imperial-held towns, hoping to entice Eugene away from Mantua while Vendôme tracked him looking for an opportunity to attack. 

In early July, Vendôme reached the village of Sissa with Philip based further south at Castelvetro di Modena and the two armies then linked up at Castelnuovo. Assuming they were advancing on Guastalla, Eugene detached three cavalry regiments under General Visconti to observe the French movements and on the evening of 23 July, they camped at the small village of Santa Vittoria, near modern day Gualtieri.

The battle

Hearing news of Visconti's presence at Santa Vittoria, Vendôme assembled a force composed of 20 squadrons of cavalry and 24 companies of infantry. Since the nominal strength of a French squadron was 135 with 50 in an infantry company, this indicates a maximum of 2,700 cavalry and 1,200 infantry. He was successful in achieving surprise, his cavalry arriving late in the morning of 26 July when most of the Imperialist horse were grazing and the French cut off their retreat by seizing the bridge over the River Crostolo. The Imperialists quickly pulled themselves together and a fierce contest took place as they tried to break out until the French infantry came up and Visconti was forced to withdraw. The Imperialists lost most of their baggage but the sources are unclear as to the number of casualties, one estimate being 1,000 Imperialists versus 200 French but this seems very high.

Aftermath
The French followed up by capturing Guastalla, then Borgoforte, forcing Prince Eugene away from Mantua and led to the Battle of Luzzara on 15 August.

Footnotes

References

External links
 commemorative site of 2002
 Map of the Battlefield (Red = Austrians , Blue = French)

Battles of the War of the Spanish Succession
Battles involving France
Battles involving Austria
Conflicts in 1702
Battle of Santa Vittoria
Battles in Emilia-Romagna